Tettigonia cantans is a species of bush crickets (or katydids) belonging to the family Tettigoniidae subfamily Tettigoniinae.

Distribution
Tettigonia cantans is present in most of Europe, in the eastern Palearctic realm, in Near East, and in North Africa. The distribution extends from the Pyrenees to China. In the Mediterranean region, Tettigonia cantans is restricted to the higher elevations of the mountains. It is absent from most parts of Western Europe (Great Britain, western France, most of Iberian Peninsula).

Habitat
Tettigonia cantans inhabits moist to moderately dry and rather cool habitats such as fens, marshes, tall herb vegetation, mountain meadows, clearcuts and woodland edges. But it is observed even in potato fields and on mountainous nutrient-poor, dry limestone grasslands with higher growing vegetation.

Description
The basic coloration of the body is usually green, with a brown stripe on the back. These grasshoppers hardly fly, their wings are shorter and wider than in the other Tettigonia species, only slightly covering the end of the abdomen. The ovipositor of the female extends beyond the tip of the wings.

Biology
Adults can be found from mid June through October. The eggs overwinter in the soil, according to literature, at least twice. They mainly feed on other insects, but also on vegetable foods. They are active from noon until night and males are detectable by their characteristic and pleasant singing (hence the Latin name cantans). The females lay eggs in moist soil. Tettigonia cantans is not endangered.

Nutrition
Especially carnal food (insects such as other locusts), and plants.

Gallery

External links
 Orthoptera
http://www.pyrgus.de/Tettigonia_cantans_en.html

Tettigoniinae
Insects described in 1775
Articles containing video clips
Orthoptera of Europe
Taxa named by Johann Kaspar Füssli